Khalilvand (also Romanized as Khalīlvand; also known as Khalīlabad and Kholvand) is a village in Benajuy-ye Gharbi Rural District, in the Central District of Bonab County, East Azerbaijan Province, Iran. At the 2006 census, its population was 1,187, in 293 families.

References 

Populated places in Bonab County